Ukrainian Braille is the braille alphabet of the Ukrainian language. It is based on Russian Braille, with a few additional letters found in the print Ukrainian alphabet.

Alphabet 
Ukrainian does not use all the letters of the Russian alphabet, and it has the additional letters є, ґ, і, ї.

The letter  і was once found in Russian Braille, but has been dropped.   є is the mirror image of a reported archaic form of Russian э. (See obsolete letters of Russian Braille.)

 g was reported in UNESCO (1990), but could not be confirmed by UNESCO (2013).  It is not repeated by Leksika.com.

Punctuation

Punctuation is from UNESCO (1990) and has not been confirmed.

Single punctuation:

Paired punctuation:

Formatting

Numbers

See also 
Belarusian Braille

References

 UNESCO (2013) World Braille Usage, 3rd edition.
 Ukrainian Braille decoder.

French-ordered braille alphabets
Ukrainian language